Charbel Tasipale is a Lebanon international rugby league footballer who plays as a  forward for the Newtown Jets in the NSW Cup.

Background
Tasipale was born in Australia. He is of Lebanese and New Zealand descent.

Playing career

Club career
Tasipale came through the youth system at the Parramatta Eels, playing in the Jersey Flegg Cup side in 2020 and 2021. He progressed into the Eels NSW Cup side in 2021, featuring in 9 games and scoring 1 try.

In 2022 he joined the Cronulla-Sutherland Sharks, and featured in 13 games and scoring 4 tries for their feeder team, the Newtown Jets in the 2022 NSW Cup.

International career
Tasipale was named in Junior Kiwis squads to face the Australian Schoolboys side.
He played for the Cedars at the 2019 Rugby League World Cup 9s.
In 2022 Tasipale was named in the Lebanon squad for the 2021 Rugby League World Cup.
He made his international debut in October 2022 against New Zealand in Warrington.
In the third group stage match at the 2021 Rugby League World Cup, Tasipale scored two tries for Lebanon in a 74-12 victory over Jamaica.

References

External links
Newtown Jets profile
Lebanon profile

Living people
Australian rugby league players
Australian people of Lebanese descent
Australian people of New Zealand descent
Newtown Jets players
Rugby league second-rows
Lebanon national rugby league team players
Year of birth missing (living people)